South Dakota Highway 89 (SD 89) is a  state highway in Fall River and Custer counties in South Dakota, United States, that travels from U.S. Route 18 (US 18) near Minnekahta to SD 87 in Custer State Park. SD 89 is concurrent with US 385 from Pringle to Custer. The portion of the highway from Custer to SD 87 is part of the Peter Norbeck Scenic Byway.

Route description

History

SD 89 was established in 1950 from Spearfish to Minnekahta. The section from SD 87 to Spearfish was redesignated as US 14 Alternate and U.S. Forest Service roads. The section of SD 89 from Custer to Sylvan Lake was once part of US 85 Alternate and replaced in December 1952.

Major intersections

See also

 List of state highways in South Dakota

References

External links

089
Transportation in Fall River County, South Dakota
Transportation in Custer County, South Dakota
U.S. Route 14
U.S. Route 85